The Little Hohonu River is a river of New Zealand's West Coast Region. It flows northwest from its origins in the Hohonu Range southwest of Lake Brunner, reaching the Greenstone River / Hokonui 20 kilometres southeast of Greymouth.

See also
List of rivers of New Zealand

References

Rivers of the West Coast, New Zealand
Grey District
Rivers of New Zealand